Farmer's Cay Airport is a private use airport located near Farmer's Cay, the Bahamas.

See also
List of airports in the Bahamas

References

External links 
 Airport record for Farmer's Cay Airport at Landings.com

Airports in the Bahamas